Erie was a federal electoral district represented in the House of Commons of Canada from 1979 to 1997. It was located in the province of Ontario. This riding was created in 1976 from parts of Lincoln and Welland ridings.

It initially consisted of the Townships of Wainfleet and West Lincoln, the City of Port Colborne and the Towns of Fort Erie and Pelham.

In 1987, it was redefined to include the part of the City of Welland lying south of a line drawn from west to east along the Welland River, east along Broadway Avenue, north along Regional Road No. 68, east along Ontario Road, and east in a straight line to Ridge Road.

The electoral district was abolished in 1996 when it was redistributed between Erie—Lincoln, Niagara Centre and Niagara Falls ridings.

Members of Parliament

This riding has elected the following Members of Parliament:

Election results

|}

|}

|}

|}

|}

See also 
 List of Canadian federal electoral districts
 Past Canadian electoral districts

External links 
Riding history from the Library of Parliament

Former federal electoral districts of Ontario